TV Tech is a trade journal covering the English-speaking broadcast television industry in North America. The magazine is published monthly by Future US.

History and profile
TV Tech is published by Future U.S. The magazine is based in New York, NY. It covers television industry news focusing primarily on new technology, FCC and regulatory issues, mobile production, sports production and newsgathering as well as studio based production. Regulatory changes such as spectrum auctions and transition to NextGen TV (ATSC 3.0) are also regularly covered.

Sister trade publications include NextTV, Broadcasting & Cable, Multichannel News, TVBEurope, Radio World, Radio World Engineering Extra.

In 2014, the magazine's owner, NewBay Media incorporated online content from Broadcast Engineering and Broadcast Engineering World to its website. In 2015, TV Technology changed to a monthly publishing schedule. In 2018, Future acquired NewBay Media.

In 2021, TV Technology changed its name to TV Tech.

References

Business magazines published in the United States
Monthly magazines published in the United States
Magazines with year of establishment missing
Magazines published in Virginia
Professional and trade magazines